Pascal Razakanantenaina (born 19 April 1987) is a Malagasy professional footballer who plays as a centre back for JS Saint-Pierroise.

International career

International

International goals
Scores and results list Madagascar's goal tally first.

Honours

Club
St. Michel United
 Seychelles First Division: 2007,2008
 Seychelles FA Cup: 2006, 2007, 2008, 2009

JS Saint-Pierroise
 Réunion Premier League: 2018, 2019
 Coupe de la Réunion: 2018, 2019

International
 Football at the Indian Ocean Island Games silver medal: 2007
 Knight Order of Madagascar: 2019

Individual
 Round of 16 best squad : Africa Cup Of Nation Egypt 2019

References

External links
 
 
 

1985 births
Living people
Association football central defenders
Malagasy footballers
Malagasy expatriate footballers
Madagascar international footballers
Expatriate footballers in Seychelles
Expatriate footballers in France
St Michel United FC players
CS Avion players
Calais RUFC players
Arras FA players
JS Saint-Pierroise players
Malagasy expatriate sportspeople in France
2019 Africa Cup of Nations players
People from Boeny
Recipients of orders, decorations, and medals of Madagascar